Meile may refer to:

 the German term for mile and as such part of horse races' proper names:
Badener Meile, Group 3 flat horse race in Germany
Frankfurter Meile, Group 3 flat horse race in Germany
Grosse Europa-Meile, Group 2 flat horse race in Germany
Hamburger Meile, Group 3 flat horse race in Germany
Galerie Urs Meile, Beijing-Lucerne, contemporary art gallery
Meilė Lukšienė (1913–2009), Lithuanian cultural historian and activist
Meile Rockefeller (born 1955), the daughter of Rodman Rockefeller

de:Meile